The Gabon men's national basketball team (French: Équipe nationale de basket-ball du Gabon) representing Gabon in men's international basketball competitions, It is administrated by the Gabon Basketball Federation.

At the AfroBasket 2015, Gabon finished 8th, its best placement ever.

Competitive record

AfroBasket
Gabon has participated at the AfroBasket (previously the FIBA Africa Championship) three times, its best result being the quarter-finals in 2015.

African Games

Basketball was part of the African Games until 2015. Later, it was replaced by the 3x3 version.
1973-2011 : Did not qualify
2015 : 8th

Current squad
Gabon team for the AfroBasket 2017 qualification.

Depth chart

Kit

Manufacturer
2015: Erima

Past squads
Gabon team for the AfroBasket 2015.

See also
Gabon national under-19 basketball team
Gabon national under-17 basketball team
Gabon national 3x3 team
Gabon women's national basketball team
Stéphane Lasme
Chris Silva

References

External links
Presentation on Afrobasket.com 
Gabon Basketball Federation Presentation on Facebook
Gabon Basketball Records at FIBA Archive

Videos
 Cape Verde v Gabon - Game Highlights - Round of 16 - AfroBasket 2015 Youtube.com video

Gabon National Basketball Team
1965 establishments in Gabon